Charles Hollis Jones (born 1945) is an American artist and furniture designer. He is known for his use of acrylic and lucite.

Life
Jones was born in Bloomington, Indiana in 1945. He moved to Los Angeles, California at the age of 16 and founded CHJ Designs. At the time, acrylic and plastic were not commonly used as a material for upscale furniture and art, but Jones began creating pieces for showrooms, such as Hudson-Rissman.

His work was well received. Frank Sinatra, Lucille Ball and Johnny Carson were among some of the first to commission Jones to design pieces for their homes.  An aging Tennessee Williams commissioned Jones to design a writing chair: The result was the Wisteria chair.

In the 1970s, Jones crafted his award-winning Edison Lamp.  Using original Thomas Edison light bulbs, Jones created a lamp with steel and lucite to show the inner workings of Edison's original technology. It won him the California Design 11 Competition and special recognition from the German government.

His work has been featured in a number of museums, including the Norton Simon Museum in Pasadena, California, and The Los Angeles Times has referred to him as a "pioneer in acrylic design." Jones resides in the Burbank area of Los Angeles and is still designing furniture and accessories. He designs awards, including the sculpture for the 2008 Golden Heart Award held at the Beverly Hills Hotel to honor Clancy Imislund for his contributions to the Midnight Mission.

References

External links

American artists
1945 births
Living people